European Tour 1977 is an album by American composer, bandleader and keyboardist Carla Bley. Recorded in 1977 in Munich, Germany, it was released on the Watt/ECM label in 1978.

Reception
Scott Yanow of AllMusic awarded the album 4½ stars and stated "One of Carla Bley's most rewarding recordings... unusual, somewhat innovative and always fun music." The Penguin Guide to Jazz awarded the album three stars.

Track listing
All compositions by Carla Bley
 "Rose and Sad Song" - 11:11  
 "Wrong Key Donkey" - 7:52  
 "Drinking Music" - 4:26  
 "Spangled Banner Minor and Other Patriotic Songs" (Including Flags, And Now The Queen, King Korn And The New National Anthem) - 19:17

Personnel
Carla Bley – organ, tenor saxophone
Michael Mantler - trumpet  
Elton Dean – alto saxophone  
Gary Windo – tenor saxophone
John Clark – french horn, guitar
Roswell Rudd – trombone  
Bob Stewart – tuba  
Terry Adams – piano  
Hugh Hopper – bass guitar, bass drum  
Andrew Cyrille – drums

References

ECM Records albums
Carla Bley albums
1978 albums